Prediction markets (also known as betting markets, information markets, decision markets, idea futures or event derivatives) are open markets where specific outcomes can be predicted using financial incentives. Essentially, they are exchange-traded markets created for the purpose of trading the outcome of events.  The market prices can indicate what the crowd thinks the probability of the event is. A prediction market contract trades between 0 and 100%. The most common form of a prediction market is a binary option market, which will expire at the price of 0 or 100%. Prediction markets can be thought of as belonging to the more general concept of crowdsourcing which is specially designed to aggregate information on particular topics of interest. The main purposes of prediction markets are eliciting aggregating beliefs over an unknown future outcome. Traders with different beliefs trade on contracts whose payoffs are related to the unknown future outcome and the market prices of the contracts are considered as the aggregated belief.

History
Before the era of scientific polling, early forms of prediction markets often existed in the form of political betting. One such political bet dates back to 1503, in which people bet on who would be the papal successor. Even then, it was already considered "an old practice". According to Paul Rhode and Koleman Strumpf, who have researched the history of prediction markets, there are records of election betting in Wall Street dating back to 1884. Rhode and Strumpf estimate that average betting turnover per US presidential election is equivalent to over 50 percent of the campaign spend.

Economic theory for the ideas behind prediction markets can be credited to Friedrich Hayek in his 1945 article "The Use of Knowledge in Society" and Ludwig von Mises in his "Economic Calculation in the Socialist Commonwealth". Modern economists agree that Mises' argument combined with Hayek's elaboration of it, is correct. Prediction markets are championed in James Surowiecki's 2004 book The Wisdom of Crowds, Cass Sunstein's 2006 Infotopia, and Douglas Hubbard's How to Measure Anything: Finding the Value of Intangibles in Business. The research literature is collected together in the peer-reviewed The Journal of Prediction Markets, edited by Leighton Vaughan Williams and published by the University of Buckingham Press.

Milestones
 One of the first modern electronic prediction markets is the University of Iowa's Iowa Electronic Markets, introduced during the 1988 US presidential election. 
 Around 1990 at Project Xanadu, Robin Hanson used the first known corporate prediction market. Employees used it in order to bet on, for example, the cold fusion controversy. 
 HedgeStreet, designated in 1991 as a market and regulated by the Commodity Futures Trading Commission, enables Internet traders to speculate on economic events.
The Hollywood Stock Exchange, a virtual market game established in 1996 and now a division of Cantor Fitzgerald, LP, in which players buy and sell prediction shares of movies, actors, directors, and film-related options, correctly predicted 32 of 2006's 39 big-category Oscar nominees and 7 out of 8 top category winners.
 In 2001, Intrade.com launched a prediction market trading platform from Ireland allowing real money trading between members on contracts related to a number of different categories including business issues, current events, financial topics, and more. Intrade ceased trading in 2013.
 In July 2003, the U.S. Department of Defense publicized a Policy Analysis Market on their website, and speculated that additional topics for markets might include terrorist attacks. A critical backlash quickly denounced the program as a "terrorism futures market" and the Pentagon hastily canceled the program.
 In 2005, scientific monthly journal Nature stated how major pharmaceutical company Eli Lilly and Company used prediction markets to help predict which development drugs might have the best chance of advancing through clinical trials, by using internal markets to forecast outcomes of drug research and development efforts.
 Also in 2005, Google Inc announced that it has been using prediction markets to forecast product launch dates, new office openings, and many other things of strategic importance. Other companies such as HP and Microsoft also conduct private markets for statistical forecasts.
 In October 2007, companies from the United States, Ireland, Austria, Germany, and Denmark formed the Prediction Market Industry Association, tasked with promoting awareness, education, and validation for prediction markets. The current status of the association appears to be defunct.
 In July 2018, the first decentralized prediction market Augur was launched on the Ethereum blockchain.

Accuracy
The ability of the prediction market to aggregate information and make accurate predictions is based on the efficient-market hypothesis, which states that assets prices are fully reflecting all available information. For instance, existing share prices always include all the relevant related information for the stock market to make accurate predictions.

James Surowiecki raises three necessary conditions for collective wisdom: diversity of information, independence of decision, and decentralization of organization. In the case of predictive market, each participant normally has diversified information from others and makes their decision independently. The market itself has a character of decentralization compared to expertise decisions. Because of these reasons, predictive market is generally a valuable source to capture collective wisdom and make accurate predictions.

Prediction markets have an advantage over other forms of forecasts due to the following characteristics. Firstly, they can efficiently aggregate a plethora of information, beliefs, and data. Next, they obtain truthful and relevant information through financial and other forms of incentives. Prediction markets can incorporate new information quickly and are difficult to manipulate.

The accuracy of the prediction market in different conditions has been studied and supported by numerous researchers.
 Steven Gjerstad (Purdue), in his paper "Risk Aversion, Beliefs, and Prediction Market Equilibrium", has shown that prediction market prices are very close to the mean belief of market participants if the agents are risk averse and the distribution of beliefs is spread out (as with a normal distribution, for example).
 Justin Wolfers (Wharton) and Eric Zitzewitz (Dartmouth) have obtained similar results to Gjerstad's conclusions in their paper "Interpreting Prediction Market Prices as Probabilities". In practice, the prices of binary prediction markets have proven to be closely related to actual frequencies of events in the real world.
 Douglas Hubbard has also conducted a sample of over 400 retired claims which showed that the probability of an event is close to its market price but, more importantly, significantly closer than the average single subjective estimate. However, he also shows that this benefit is partly offset if individuals first undergo calibrated probability assessment training so that they are good at assessing odds subjectively. The key benefit of the market, Hubbard claims, is that it mostly adjusts for uncalibrated estimates and, at the same time, incentivizes market participants to seek further information.
 Lionel Page and Robert Clemen have looked at the quality of predictions for events taking place some time in the future. They found that predictions are very good when the event predicted is close in time. For events which take place further in time (e.g. elections in more than a year), prices are biased towards 50%. This bias comes from the traders' "time preferences" (their preferences not to lock their funds for a long time in assets). 
Due to the accuracy of the prediction market, it has been applied to different industries to make important decisions. Some examples include:
 Prediction market can be utilized to improve forecast and has a potential application to test lab-based information theories based on its feature of information aggregation. Researchers have applied prediction markets to assess unobservable information in Google's IPO valuation ahead of time.
 In healthcare, predictive markets can help forecast the spread of infectious disease. In a pilot study, a statewide influenza in Iowa was predicted by these markets 2–4 weeks in advance with clinical data volunteered from participating health care workers.
 Some corporations have harnessed internal predictive markets for decisions and forecasts. In these cases, employees can use virtual currency to bet on what they think will happen for this company in the future. The most accurate guesser will win a money prize as payoff. For example, Best Buy once experimented on using the predictive market to predict whether a Shanghai store can be open on time. The virtual dollar drop in the market successfully forecasted the lateness of the business and prevented the company from extra money loss.

Although prediction markets are often fairly accurate and successful, there are many times the market fails in making the right prediction or making one at all. Based mostly on an idea in 1945 by Austrian economist Friedrich Hayek, prediction markets are "mechanisms for collecting vast amounts of information held by individuals and synthesizing it into a useful data point".

One way the prediction market gathers information is through James Surowiecki's phrase, "The Wisdom of Crowds", in which a group of people with a sufficiently broad range of opinions can collectively be cleverer than any individual. However, this information gathering technique can also lead to the failure of the prediction market. Oftentimes, the people in these crowds are skewed in their independent judgements due to peer pressure, panic, bias, and other breakdowns developed out of a lack of diversity of opinion.

One of the main constraints and limits of the wisdom of crowds is that some prediction questions require specialized knowledge that majority of people do not have. Due to this lack of knowledge, the crowd's answers can sometimes be very wrong.

The second market mechanism is the idea of the marginal-trader hypothesis. According to this theory, "there will always be individuals seeking out places where the crowd is wrong". These individuals, in a way, put the prediction market back on track when the crowd fails and values could be skewed.

In early 2017, researchers at MIT developed the "surprisingly popular" algorithm to help improve answer accuracy from large crowds. The method is built off the idea of taking confidence into account when evaluating the accuracy of an answer. The method asks people two things for each question: What they think the right answer is, and what they think popular opinion will be. The variation between the two aggregate responses indicates the correct answer.

The effects of manipulation and biases are also internal challenges prediction markets need to deal with, i.e. liquidity or other factors not intended to be measured are taken into account as risk factors by the market participants, distorting the market probabilities. Prediction markets may also be subject to speculative bubbles. For example, in the year 2000 IEM presidential futures markets, seeming "inaccuracy" comes from buying that occurred on or after Election Day, 11/7/00, but, by then, the trend was clear.

There can also be direct attempts to manipulate such markets. In the Tradesports 2004 presidential markets there was an apparent manipulation effort. An anonymous trader sold short so many Bush 2004 presidential futures contracts that the price was driven to zero, implying a zero percent chance that Bush would win. The only rational purpose of such a trade would be an attempt to manipulate the market in a strategy called a "bear raid". If this was a deliberate manipulation effort it failed, however, as the price of the contract rebounded rapidly to its previous level. As more press attention is paid to prediction markets, it is likely that more groups will be motivated to manipulate them. However, in practice, such attempts at manipulation have always proven to be very short lived. In their paper entitled "Information Aggregation and Manipulation in an Experimental Market" (2005), Hanson, Oprea and Porter (George Mason U), show how attempts at market manipulation can in fact end up increasing the accuracy of the market because they provide that much more profit incentive to bet against the manipulator.

Using real-money prediction market contracts as a form of insurance can also affect the price of the contract. For example, if the election of a leader is perceived as negatively impacting the economy, traders may buy shares of that leader being elected, as a hedge.

These prediction market inaccuracies were especially prevalent during Brexit and the 2016 US Presidential Elections.  On Thursday, 23 June 2016, the United Kingdom voted to leave the European Union. Even until the moment votes were counted, prediction markets leaned heavily on the side of staying in the EU and failed to predict the outcomes of the vote. According to Michael Traugott, a former president of the American Association for Public Opinion Research, the reason for the failure of the prediction markets is due to the influence of manipulation and bias shadowed by mass opinion and public opinion. Clouded by the similar mindset of users in prediction markets, they created a paradoxical environment where they began self-reinforcing their initial beliefs (in this case, that the UK would vote to remain in the EU). Here, we can observe the ruinous effect that bias and lack of diversity of opinion may have in the success of a prediction market.
Similarly, during the 2016 US Presidential Elections, prediction markets failed to predict the outcome, throwing the world into mass shock. Like the Brexit case, information traders were caught in an infinite loop of self-reinforcement once initial odds were measured, leading traders to "use the current prediction odds as an anchor" and seemingly discounting incoming prediction odds completely. Traders essentially treated the market odds as correct probabilities and did not update enough using outside information, causing the prediction markets to be too stable to accurately represent current circumstances. Koleman Strumpf, a University of Kansas professor of business economics, also suggests that a bias effect took place during the US elections; the crowd was unwilling to believe in an outcome with Donald Trump winning and caused the prediction markets to turn into "an echo chamber", where the same information circulated and ultimately lead to a stagnant market.

However, when compared to results from opinion polls, prediction markets are generally more accurate by 74%.  Prediction markets have also been used to assess successfully the reproducibility of scientific research in psychology. A recent randomized experiment showed that prediction markets were slightly (12%) less accurate than prediction polls, an alternative method for eliciting and statistically aggregating probability judgments from a crowd.

Other issues

Legality
Because online gambling is outlawed in the United States through federal laws and many state laws as well, most prediction markets that target US users operate with "play money" rather than "real money": they are free to play (no purchase necessary) and usually offer prizes to the best traders as incentives to participate. Notable exceptions are the Iowa Electronic Markets, which is operated by the University of Iowa under the cover of a no-action letter from the Commodity Futures Trading Commission, and PredictIt, which is operated by Victoria University of Wellington under cover of a similar no-action letter.

Controversial incentives
Some kinds of prediction markets may create controversial incentives. For example, a market predicting the death of a world leader might be quite useful for those whose activities are strongly related to this leader's policies, but it also might turn into an assassination market.

List of prediction markets
There are a number of commercial and academic prediction markets operating publicly.

Public prediction markets
 The Iowa Electronic Markets is an academic market examining elections where positions are limited to $500.
 PredictIt is a prediction market for political and financial events.
 SciCast was a reputation-based combinatorial prediction market focusing on science and technology forecasting.
iPredict was a prediction market in New Zealand.
Metaculus is a reputation-based prediction website with the ability to make numeric-range or date-range predictions, inspired by SciCast.
Good Judgment Open is a reputation-based prediction website.
Augur (software) is a decentralized prediction market platform built on the Ethereum blockchain.

Types

Reputation-based 
Some prediction websites, sometimes classified as prediction markets, do not involve betting real money but rather add to or subtract from a predictor's reputation points based on the accuracy of a prediction. This incentive system may be better-suited than traditional prediction markets for niche or long-timeline questions. These include Manifold Markets, Metaculus, and Good Judgment Open.

A 2006 study found that real-money prediction markets were significantly more accurate than play-money prediction markets for non-sports events.

Combinatorial prediction markets
A combinatorial prediction market is a type of prediction market where participants can make bets on combinations of outcomes. The advantage of making bets on combinations of outcomes is that, in theory, conditional information can be better incorporated into the market price.

One difficulty of combinatorial prediction markets is that the number of possible combinatorial trades scales exponentially with the number of normal trades. For example, a market with merely 100 binary contracts would have 2^100 possible combinations of contracts. These exponentially large data structures can be too large for a computer to keep track of, so there have been efforts to develop algorithms and rules to make the data more tractable.

See also
 Election prediction market
 Futarchy
 Futures exchange
 Prediction games
 Betting exchange
 Long Bet Project

References

Sources
Academic papers
 Bell, Tom W. Prediction Markets For Promoting the Progress of Science and the Useful Arts – PDF file – George Mason Law Review (14 Geo. Mason L. Rev 37) (2006)
 Berg, Joyce E., & Thomas A. Rietz. The Iowa Electronic Market: Lessons Learned and Answers Yearned – PDF file – 2005-01-00
 Erikson, Robert S., & Christopher Wlezien. "Are Political Markets Really Superior to Polls as Election Predictors?" Public Opinion Quarterly 72(2), Summer 2008, pp. 190–215.
 Gjerstad, Steven. "Risk Aversion, Beliefs, and Prediction Market Equilibrium," University of Arizona Working Paper 04-17, 2005.
 
 
 Hanson, Robin. The Informed Press Favored the Policy Analysis Market - PDF file - 2005-05-05
 Manski, Charles F. Interpreting the Predictions of Prediction Markets – PDF file – Revised Aug 2005—Manski suggests that there needs to be a better theoretic basis for interpreting market prices as probability, and provides a simple model for this.
  Provides a detailed history of political prediction markets in the US, and shows early markets in the 19th and early 20th Centuries provided accurate forecasts and satisfied market efficiency. 
  Discusses history of prediction markets internationally, as well as additional details on the historical US markets.
 
 
 Spann, Martin & Skiera, Bernd."Internet-Based Virtual Stock Markets for Business Forecasting" – PDF file – Discusses theory, design options and presents empirical comparisons on forecasting accuracy of prediction markets
 Wolfers, Justin, & Eric Zitzewitz. Prediction Markets – PDF file – 2004-05-00
 Wolfers, Justin, & Eric Zitzewitz.Interpreting Prediction Market Prices as Probabilities – PDF file – Draft version 2007-01-08 – Expands on the work of Manski, providing a more general model wherein it is somewhat rational to interpret market prices as probabilities
 Watkins, Jennifer H.Prediction Markets as an Aggregation Mechanism for Collective Intelligence – Proceedings of 2007 UCLA Lake Arrowhead Human Complex Systems Conference, Lake Arrowhead, CA, 25–29 April 2007.
 Storkey, A.J. Machine Learning Markets – Journal of Machine Learning Research C&WP 15:AISTATS. 2011.
 Storkey A.J., Millin, J., Geras, K. Isoelastic agents and wealth updates in machine learning markets – International Conference in Machine Learning. 2012.

External links
 Video of Robin Hanson's Combinatorial Prediction Markets lecture at the 'Uncertainty in Artificial Intelligence' conference in Helsinki, 2008

 
Social information processing
Market (economics)
Survey methodology
Forecasting